Joseph Ualesi (born 17 September 1993) is an Australian professional rugby league footballer who played for the Parramatta Eels in the National Rugby League.

Background
Born in Campbelltown, New South Wales, Ualesi is of Samoan descent and played his junior rugby league for Fairfield United, before being signed by the Parramatta Eels.

Playing career

Early career
From 2011 to 2013, Ualesi played for the Parramatta Eels' NYC team.

2013
In Round 26 of the 2013 NRL season, Ualesi made his NRL debut for the Eels against the Newcastle Knights. On 13 October, he played for the Junior Kangaroos against the Junior Kiwis.

2015
On 11 July, Ualesi re-signed with the Eels on a 1-year contract.

2018
In 2018, Ualesi was released by Parramatta after only making one appearance for the club in five seasons.

References

External links
Parramatta Eels profile

1993 births
Living people
Australian rugby league players
Australian sportspeople of Samoan descent
Parramatta Eels players
Junior Kangaroos players
Rugby league second-rows
Rugby league locks
Rugby league players from Sydney
Wentworthville Magpies players